The Church of Saint Mary Help of Christians in Via Tuscolana is a parish and titular church, minor basilica of Rome.

The titulus S. Mariae Auxiliatricis in via Tusculana was established by Pope Paul VI on June 7, 1967, by the apostolic constitution "Ad gubernacula christianae".

History 
Created parish church on March 25, 1932, with the Apostolic Constitution "Inter pastoralis" of Pope Pius XI and entrusted to the Salesians of Don Bosco, it was designed by architects Nicola Mosso and Giulio Vallotti between 1931 and 1936.

Interior 
The interior follows a plan of a mix between a Latin cross and Greek cross, with three naves. The walls and ceiling are decorated with frescoes of Baroque inspiration, made by Giuseppe Melle between 1957 and 1965.

List of Cardinal Protectors 
 Francesco Carpino, pro illa vice (1967–1978)
 Giuseppe Caprio (1979–1990)
 Pio Laghi (1991–2002)
 Tarcisio Bertone, SDB pro hac vice (2003–2008)
 Paolo Sardi (2010 - 2019)

Notes

References 
 Description of the frescoes of the church of Saint Mary Help of Christians in Via Tuscolana

External links
 

Maria Ausiliatrice
Maria Ausiliatrice
20th-century Roman Catholic church buildings in Italy
Salesian churches in Italy
Rome Q. VIII Tuscolano